Disco is an unincorporated community in Blount County, Tennessee, United States. Its post office closed in 1903.

It is unknown why the name "Disco" was applied to this community. Disco has been noted for its unusual place name.

Notes

Unincorporated communities in Blount County, Tennessee
Unincorporated communities in Tennessee